Mableton is an unincorporated community and census-designated place (CDP) in Cobb County, Georgia, United States. According to the 2020 census, Mableton has a population of 40,834. Upon Brookhaven's cityhood in December 2012, Mableton became the largest unincorporated CDP in Metro Atlanta. On November 8, 2022, following the 2022 midterm elections, a referendum on cityhood was passed. It is set to become the largest city in Cobb County in terms of population.

History 
Between the 16th and 19th centuries, most of the land in present-day southern Cobb County belonged to the Cherokee and Creek. Two indigenous villages were established near the area that will later become known as Mableton - the settlements of Sweet Water Town and Nickajack. Both tribes coinhabited the area peacefully, with one legend claiming that eventual ownership of the area by the Cherokee was settled via a ball game. One of the earliest known records of white Europeans being aware of the inhabitants is an 1839 map depicting a 'Nickajack Creek' converging with the Chattahoochee River south and west of the Standing Peachtree settlement. Ultimately, all native inhabitants in Georgia were forced out of their lands by the 1830s, and much of the vacancies were granted to European settlers by land lottery.

The town was named after Scottish immigrant Robert Mable (1803-1885), who on September 11, 1843, bought 300 acres (approximately 120 hectares or 1.2 km2) of land in southern Cobb County from the Georgia Land Lottery of 1832. Mable was a millwright and farmer who grew cotton, corn, potatoes, and sorghum in the area; he owned between 11 and 48 slaves by 1860. According to oral interviews, Mable was a "fair and kind" enslaver who educated slave children alongside his own, and eventually also liberated his slaves before any government mandate ordered him to. The Robert Mable House and Cemetery, located off U.S. 78 on Floyd Road just north of Clay Road, now includes an amphitheater which hosts public events.

More white settlers moved into the northern edge of Mableton by Nickajack Creek, near Smyrna, in the mid-1800s. They formed a community initially known as 'Mill Grove', and later 'Nickajack.' The creek provided ample power to run grist, saw, cotton, and woolen mills. A covered bridge, originally built c. 1848–1850, traverses the stream and is now part of a historical district. It is one of the few remaining covered bridges in Georgia, and still highly active today after it was later buttressed to handle automobile traffic. A notable resident of the area during that period was John Gann, Cobb County's first state senator. His home, built in 1841, still stands today and is also part of the historical district.

During the Atlanta campaign of the Civil War, Union officers Walter Q. Gresham and Francis P. Blair Jr. of the XVII Corps reached Mableton on July 3, 1864, after the Union defeat at Kennesaw. Gresham replenished his troops' supplies and received medical care at Robert Mable's house, and camped for the night before advancing to Atlanta. The house was spared from the carnage of Sherman's March to the Sea.

The Georgia Pacific Railway (later absorbed by Southern Railway and today known as the Norfolk Southern Railway) opened a railroad station in Mableton in December 1881. The chief engineer erected a sign displaying 'Mableton' upon completion of the station in honor of Robert. The first train from Atlanta arrived at the station just before Christmas. Shortly after, the post office was established on June 28, 1882. The arrival of the railroad allowed Mableton to act as a commercial hub for then-rural Cobb County. Cotton export flourished throughout the county from the 1890s until the Great Depression.

On August 19, 1912, Mableton was incorporated as a town but was disincorporated on August 17, 1916. In that year, the town suffered from a heavy flood, resulting in an unexpected tax burden being placed upon the residents for repairs. But after locals successfully demanded that a tax on storm drains be shared by all of Cobb County instead, the town's charter was revoked and Mableton was disincorporated. H.A. Glore, a medical doctor from Atlanta Medical College (now Emory University), served as the town's mayor during this time.

Geography
Mableton is located at  (33.813355, -84.571691). The Chattahoochee River acts as the southeast border, separating Cobb County from west Fulton County — where the historic African-American neighborhood of Collier Heights and the former site of the Bankhead Courts housing project are nearby. Two suburban cities directly border Mableton: Austell in the west and Smyrna in the north. Lithia Springs, an unincorporated community, is directly southwest.

Mableton is approximately 15 miles west-northwest from the city of Atlanta, and approximately 20 miles from Hartsfield-Jackson Atlanta International Airport.

Topography 

Nickajack Creek, a tributary of the Chattahoochee, runs near the Smyrna-Mableton line. Mableton and most of Atlanta is in the Piedmont region, characterized by rolling hills and gentle slopes that make for narrow roads.

Demographics

2020 census

As of the 2020 United States census, there were 40,834 people, 14,465 households, and 10,945 families residing in the CDP, with a population density of 1,804.5 people per square mile. Mableton is the most populous unincorporated census-designated place (CDP) in the Metro Atlanta area. East Cobb - with a population estimate of around 208,000 in 2019 - is technically the most populous unincorporated area in the metro, though it is not recognized as a CDP in the Census Bureau.

2018 ACS
The 5-year estimates of the 2018 ACS state that 39.2% of the population was White, 48.5% African American, 0.2% Native American/Alaska Native, 2.2% Asian, 0.0% Native Hawaiian/Pacific Islander, 6.2% from some other race alone, and 3.7% from two or more races. Hispanic or Latino of any race were 18.0% of the population. Individuals who identified as White alone, not Hispanic or Latino, were 30.3% of the population.

There were 2,115 identified veterans in the area as of 2018. Foreign born persons (non-U.S. citizens or U.S. nationals at birth) made up 18.1% of the population.

As of 2018, the median income for a household in the CDP was $64,790. Males had a median income of $50,610 versus $46,239 for females. The per capita income for the CDP was $31,474. About 11.9% of the population was below the poverty line.

In 2018, the estimated median age was 35 years, with 27% under 18 years old, 64% from 18 to 64 years old, and 9% 65 years and older. For every 100 females in all age groups, there were 88.3 males. For every 100 females age 18 and over, there were 82.6 males; for every 100 age 65 and over, there were 47.6 males.

Among those aged 25 or older in 2018, 87.2% graduated from high school and 36.5% obtained a bachelor's degree or higher.

2000 census
There were 10,894 households, out of which 34.9% had children under the age of 18 living with them, 53.5% were married couples living together, 14.5% had a female householder with no husband present, and 26.9% were non-families. 21.2% of all households were made up of individuals, and 6.7% had someone living alone who was 65 years of age or older. The average household size was 2.72 and the average family size was 3.12.

Government 
Mableton is a part of Cobb County's District 4, along with Austell, Powder Springs, south Marietta, and sections of Smyrna. The district is led by Monique Sheffield.

At the federal level, Mableton is a part of Georgia's 13th congressional district, currently served by Rep. David Scott (D) since 2003. The majority of the district voted for Democrats in the 2004, 2008, 2012, 2016, and 2020 presidential elections, as well as for Stacey Abrams in the 2018 gubernatorial election.

Transportation 
The East-West Connector, Mableton Parkway (SR 139), and Veterans' Memorial Highway (U.S. 78) are major roads that run through Mableton, with the latter two directly connecting to Atlanta. Veterans' Memorial Highway connects to Atlanta via Bankhead as the Donald Lee Hollowell Parkway, while Mableton Parkway connects via the Westview/West End neighborhoods as M.L.K. Jr. Drive and the Ralph David Abernathy Parkway.

Nearby highways include the western segment of I-285 (about 6 mi away) and I-20 (about 5 mi away).

The public-use, general aviation Fulton County Airport (Brown Field) is adjacent to Mableton's southeast border with Fulton County. It includes two runways and handles approximately 65,000 operations annually.

Public transportation via bus is run by CobbLinc.

Recreation

Trails 

The Silver Comet Trail runs through Mableton. It is a 61.5 mile paved trail with a 2% grade, beginning in Smyrna and ending at the Georgia-Alabama state line near Cedartown, GA.

Heritage Park is a smaller trail running along Nickajack Creek that ultimately connects to the Comet. A notable landmark includes the ruins of a woolen mill built in the 1860s.

Parks 

 Lions Park
 Thompson Park
 Nickajack Park
 Riverline Park
 Wallace Park

Community Garden 

The Historic Mableton Community Garden is located at 5178 Floyd Road.

Amphitheater 
Governor Roy Barnes provided a state grant for construction of a 2,500-seat amphitheater shortly after his appointment in 2000, fulfilling residents' desire dating back from the 1970s. The Mable House Barnes Amphitheater is a $7 million state and local investment and attracts numerous high-profile acts.

Amusement park 
Six Flags Over Georgia is located near Mableton's border with Austell, adjacent to I-20. The park is home to 11 roller coasters, the first "floorless" freefall tower ride in the world, and a fully-functional carousel from 1908 listed in the National Register of Historic Places.

Education
The Cobb County School District operates several public schools in the area:

Elementary schools 

 Mableton Elementary School
 Clay-Harmony Leland Elementary School
 Bryant Elementary School
 Riverside Elementary School
 H.A.V.E.N. Academy at Skyview

Middle schools 

 Floyd Middle School
 Garret Middle School
 Lindley Middle School

High school 

 Pebblebrook High School – famous alumni include Glee actress Becca Tobin, Cleveland Cavaliers player Collin Sexton, and Lil Yachty

Private schools 
The Georgia Japanese Language School (GJLS; ジョージア日本語学校 Jōjia Nihongo Gakkō), a part-time supplementary Japanese school, holds its classes at the Lindley 6th Grade Academy in Mableton; Lindley was previously occupied by the W. H. Barnes Education Center. The GJLS originally opened with nine students in 1974 at Oglethorpe University, serving grades 1 through 9. The school moved to W.H. Barnes in 2002.

Whitefield Academy, a Christ-centered college preparatory school in Smyrna, is near Mableton.

The SAE School is an "independent project-based learning school" for pre-school to 8th grade students located in Mableton.

Primrose Schools, a private school for early preschool children, is in the Providence neighborhood of Mableton.

Public library 

 South Cobb Regional Library

Redevelopment
In the summer of 2010, more than a hundred residents, bureaucrats, politicians, architects, designers and traffic engineers spent a week designing a vision for a redeveloped downtown Mableton. It was then formalized by Duany Plater-Zyberk into a plan that was unanimously approved by Cobb County's Board of Commissioners in 2013. The establishment of the new Mableton Town Center (MTC) is part of the county's 2040 Comprehensive Plan.

As of late 2020, Embry Development Company is in talks with the Cobb County Board of Commissioners to begin construction of a 31-acre mixed-use commercial/residential plaza at Mableton Parkway and Old Powder Springs Road. The development calls for 81 town homes, 46 "courtyard cottage" style houses, 21 detached single-family homes, and 13,500 square feet of retail and restaurant space. The particular area, in addition to establishments along Veterans Memorial Highway (U.S. 78), is largely dated and rundown, with some businesses failing to adhere to building codes.

Another company, Garner Group, is also redeveloping a nearly 40 year old strip mall along Floyd Road and East-West Connector into a mixed-use, pedestrian-friendly plaza. There will be 360 luxury apartments and 42 townhomes on the 60-acre site, with the entire development occupying about 720,000 square feet. Planning Commission Chair Galt Porter, proponent of the plan, stated of the recent growth in the area: "It's probably been 15 to 20 years since there's been a market rate development of apartments anywhere close to this...you have to go to Smyrna to get something, or you have to go out all the way into Powder Springs to get something. There's just nothing in this area." The project was approved by the Cobb County Board of Commissioners on October 21, 2020.

Cityhood 
In 2020, a local initiative known as the South Cobb Alliance fostered a debate for cityhood. A feasibility study conducted by the Carl Vinson Institute of Government stated that the potential city would generate $11.3 million in operating expenses and $14.6 million in revenue. Alternatively, nearby Smyrna considered annexing parts of Mableton. This move would have made Smyrna the largest city in Cobb County, surpassing the county seat of Marietta, and ultimately disrupt Mableton's cityhood efforts.

Following the 2022 midterm elections, a referendum on cityhood was passed, with 13,162 in favor of Mableton's cityhood and 11,675 rejecting it. It is set to become the largest city in Cobb County in terms of population, with the new city incorporating about 77,000 residents. The proposed city limits also include areas of unincorporated Smyrna and Austell.

Notable people/residents

Roy Barnes, 80th Governor of Georgia from 1999 to 2003, the most recent Democrat to hold the office
Kenny Selmon, track and field athlete competing in the 2020 Tokyo Summer Olympics
Lil Yachty, Grammy-nominated trap artist
Erica Thomas, Georgia State Representative 
Anna Benson, glamour model and ex-wife of baseball player Kris Benson
AR Fox, pro wrestler
T. J. Holmes, CNN News Anchor
Kenny McKinley, former wide receiver for Denver Broncos
Michael King, television producer/reporter and commentator
Collin Sexton, basketball player for the Cleveland Cavaliers
Ronnie DeVoe, Member of New Edition

Gallery

References

Census-designated places in Cobb County, Georgia
Former municipalities in Georgia (U.S. state)
Census-designated places in Georgia (U.S. state)
Populated places disestablished in 1916